The Deadmans Cove Formation is a geologic formation cropping out in Newfoundland. This is the part of Musgravetown group.

References

Geology of Newfoundland and Labrador